James is an English language given name of Hebrew origin, most commonly used for males.

Etymology
It is a modern descendant, through Old French James, of Vulgar Latin Iacomus (cf. Italian Giacomo, Portuguese Tiago, Spanish Iago, Santiago), a derivative version of Latin Iacobus, Latin form of the Hebrew name Jacob (original ). The final -s in the English first names is typical of those borrowed from Old French, where it was the former masculine subject case (cf. Giles, Miles, Charles, etc.). James is a very popular name in English-speaking populations.

Since in Spanish and its derivatives the J is pronounced  (Kh), many Jews used this name for representing the Hebrew name of Haim, also written as Chaim (pronounced ) or its similar forms in Spanish and English like Jack, Jaime, Jamie or Jim, even though the origins of the two names (Haim and Jacob) are very different.

Forms of James

Abbreviations
 Jas (English)

Diminutives

 Jim or Jimmy/Jimy/Jimmi/Jimi/Jimmie 
 Jimbo
 Jay
 Jack
 Jaime or Jamie

Variants in English and various other languages
Afrikaans: Jakobus, Koos (diminutive), Kobus (diminutive), Jakko (diminutive)
Albanian: Jakup, Jakub, Jakob or Jakov
Alemannic: Köbi, Chöbi, Jockel, Jakobli (diminutive), Jockeli (diminutive), Joggi
Amharic: ያዕቆብ (Ya‘əqob)
Arabic: يعقوب (Yaʻqub)
Aragonese – Chaime, Chacobo
Armenian: Յակոբ in classical orthography and Հակոբ in reformed orthography (Western: Hagop, Eastern: Hakob)
Asturian: Diegu, Xacobu, Xaime
Azerbaijani: Yaqub
Basque: Jakue, Jakob, Jakobe, Jagoba, Jaime, Jakes; Jakoba, Jagobe (feminized); Jago (diminutive)
Bavarian: Jackl, Jock, Jocke, Jockei
Belarusian: Jakub, Якуб (Yakub), Jakaŭ, Якаў (Yakaw)
Bengali: জেমস (Jēms/Jēmsh), ইয়াকুব (Iyakub)
Biblical Hebrew: Yaakov (יעקב)
Bosnian: Jakub
Breton: Jagu, Jagut, Jacut, Jak, Jakes, Jakez, Jakezig, Jakou, Jalm, Chalm
Bulgarian: Яков (Yakov)
Cantonese 占士 (Jeem-see) 
Catalan: Jaume, Xaume, Jacme, Jacob, Dídac, Santiago
Cherokee (Tsalagi): ᏥᎻ (Tsi-mi)
Chinese: 詹姆斯 (Zhānmǔsī), 詹姆士 (Zhānmǔshì)
Cornish: Jago, Jammes, Jamma, Jamys
Croatian: Jakov, Jakob, Jakša
Czech: Jakub, Jakoubek (diminutive), Kuba (diminutive), Kubík (diminutive), Kubíček (diminutive), Kubas (informal, uncommon), Kubi (informal), Kubsik (informal, uncommon)
Danish: Ib, Jacob, Jakob, Jeppe, Jim, Jimmy
Dutch: Jacob, Jacobus, Jakob, Jaco, Jacco, Cobus, Coos, Jaap, Kobe, Kobus, Koos, Sjaak, Sjakie
English:
 Jack
 Jacob
 Jakob (uncommon, by way of German, Yiddish, etc.)
 Jacoby (rare, chiefly American, and originally a surname)
 Jake, Jakey (diminutive)
 Coby/Koby (diminutive, uncommon, chiefly American)
 Jamie (diminutive, found in all primarily English-speaking lands, United Kingdom, Ireland, Canada, United States, etc.)
 Jaime/Jaimie (diminutive, uncommon, chiefly American, and by way of Spanish)
 Jim
 Jambo
 Jay
 James
 Jem (diminutive, also taken as a diminutive for Jeremiah, Jeremy or Jemma)
 Jacqueline/Jaqueline (feminized, by way of French)
 Jacqui/Jaqui (feminized diminutive), Jackie (feminized diminutive, chiefly American), Jacki (feminized diminutive)
 Jamie/Jamey/Jami (feminized)
 Jamesina, Jamesa (feminine form)
Esperanto: Jakobo
Estonian: Jakob, Jaakob, Jaagup, Jaak
Faroese: Jákup, Jakku (only in double names such as Jóan Jakku, Hans Jakku. Previously spelled Jacob/Jakob)
Filipino: Jaime, Jacób, Santiago (religious usage)
Finnish: Jaakob, Jaakoppi, Jaakko, Jaska, Jimi, Jouppi (archaic, nowadays only as a surname), Kauppi (archaic, nowadays only as a surname)
French: Jacques, Jacqueline (feminized), James, Jammes, Jacob, Jacquot (diminutive), Jacot (diminutive), Jacotte (feminized), Jaco (diminutive), Jack (diminutive), Jacky (diminutive), Jacq (diminutive), Jacquy (diminutive)
Frisian: Japik
Friulian: Jacum
Galician: Xaime, Iago, Diego, Xacobe, Xácome
Georgian: იაკობ (Iakob), კობა (Koba)
German: Jakob, Jakobus, Jeckel (diminutive), Jäckel (diminutive), Köbes (diminutive), Köbi (Swiss German diminutive)
Greek:
 Ιακώβ (Iakov, in the Septuagint)
 Ιάκωβος (Iakovos, New Testament)
 Γιακουμής (Yakoumis, colloquial, possibly also from Ιωακείμ (Joachim))
 Ιακωβίνα (Iakovina, feminized)
 Γιάγκος (Yangos, probably through Slavic languages
 Ζάκης or Ζακ (Zakis or Zak, French-sounding)
Hawaiian: Kimo, Iakobo, Iakopo
Hebrew: Jacob and James are two separate, yet related names.
 Jacob is יעקב (Ya'aqov or Yakov), with its diminutives:
 קובי (Kobi)
 ג'קי (Jecky : from Jacky)
 ז'אק (Zhack from French pronunciation of Jacques)
 יקי (Yaki)
 יענקל'ה/ינקי (Yankalleh/Yankee - through Yiddish).
 James is גֵ'יימס/גִ'ימי/גִ'ים/ (James/Jimmy/Jim from English).  
 The Spanish name Jaime for James is pronounced in Spanish like the Israeli pronunciation of חיים (Haim or Chaim pronounced Kha-yim and meaning life). Diminutives of Chaim are: 
 חיימי Chayimee (from Yiddish or Spanish Jaime)
 חיק'ל/חיימקה (Chaikel/Chayimke from Yiddish)
Hindi: जेम्स (Jēmsa)
Hungarian: Jakab, Jákob
Icelandic: Jakob
Igbo Jems, James, Jekọb
Indonesian: Yakobus, Yakubus
Irish: Séamas/Seumas/Séamus, Shéamais (vocative, whence Anglicised: Hamish), Seamus (anglicized), Shamus (anglicized), Séimí (diminutive), Séimín (diminutive), Séamuisín (diminutive), Iacób
Italian: Giacomo, Iacopo or Jacopo, Giacobbe, Giacomino, Giaco, Giamo, Mino
Japanese: ジェームス (Jēmusu)
Jerriais: Jimce
Kannada: ಜೇಮ್ಸ್ (Jēms)
Kazakh: Жақып (Zhaqip, Jacob), Якуб (Yakub, Yacoob)
Kikuyu: Jemuthi, Jemethi, Jimmi, Jakubu (Pronounced "Jakufu")
Korean: 제임스 (Jeimseu), 야고보 (Yakobo)
Late Roman: Iacomus
Latin: Iacobus, Iacomus (vulgarized), Didacus (later Latin)
Latvian: Jēkabs, Jākubs, Jakobs
Limburgish: Jakob, Sjaak, Sjak, Keube
Lithuanian: Jokūbas
Lombard: Giacom, Giacum, Jacom
Low German: Jak, Jakob, Kööb, Köpke
Luxembourgish: Jakob, Jak, Jeek, Jeki
Macedonian: Јаков (Yakov)
Malay: يعقوب (Ya'qub), Ya'kub, Yakub
Malayalam: Chacko, Jacob, Yakkob (pronounced Yah-kohb)
Maltese: Ġakbu, Ġakmu, Jakbu
Manx: Jamys
Māori: Hemi
Northern Sami: Jáhkot
Norwegian: Jakob, Jakop, Jeppe
Occitan: Jacme (pronounced Jamme), Jaume, Jammes (surname, pronounced Jamme), James (surname, pronounced Jamme)
Persian: یعقوب(Yaʻqub)
Piedmontese: Giaco, Jaco (Montferrat dialect); diminutive: Giacolin, Giacolèt, Jacolin
Polish: Jakub, Kuba (diminutive), Kubuś (diminutive endearing)
Portuguese: Jacó (O.T. form), Jacob, Jaime, Iago, Tiago (contracted form used in the N.T.), Thiago and Thyago (variant used in Brazil), Diogo, Diego, Santiago, Jaqueline (fem.)
Provençal: Jacme
Punjabi: ਜੇਮਸ (Jēmasa)
Romanian: Iacob, Iacov
Romansh: Giachen, Giacun
Russian: Иаков (Iakov) (archaic O.T. form), Яков (Yakov, Iakov), Яша (Yasha) (diminutive)
Samoan: Iakopo, Semisi, Simi (Jim)
Sardinian: Giagu (Logudorese), Iacu (Nuorese)
Scots: Jeams, Jeames, Jamie, Jizer, Jamesie
Scottish Gaelic: Seumas, Sheumais (vocative), Hamish (anglicized)
Serbian (Cyrillic/Latinic): Јаков/Jakov (Yakov); Јакша/Jakša (Yaksha); Јаша/Jaša (Yasha) (diminutive)
Sicilian: Giacumu, Jàcumu
Sinhala: දියෝගු (Diogu), ජාකොබ් (Jakob), සන්තියාගො (Santhiyago), යාකොබ් (Yakob)
Slovak: Jakub, Kubo, Kubko (diminutive), Jakubko (diminutive)
Slovene: Jakob, Jaka
Somali: Yacquub
Spanish: Jaime, Jacobo, Yago, Tiago, Santiago, Diego, Jacoba (fem.), Jacob
Swahili: Yakobo
Swedish: Jakob
Sylheti: য়াকুব (Yakub)
Syriac: ܝܰܥܩܽܘܒ (Yaqub)
Tamil: ஜேம்ஸ் (Jēms)
Telugu: యాకోబు (Yākôbu) జేమ్స్ (Jēms)
 (Jame, Cems̄̒)
Turkish: Yakup, Yakub
Ukrainian: Яків (Yakiv)
Urdu: جیمز (James), یعقوب (Yaqoob)
Venetian: Jàcomo, Jàco
Walloon: Djåke
Welsh: Iago, Siâms
Yiddish: יעקב (Yankev/Yankiff), קאפעל/קופפל (Kappel/Koppel), יענקל/יענקלה (Yankel/Yankelleh), יענקי (Yankee), יאקאב (Yakab - from Romanian Iacob), and the Gentile name not associated with Jacob: דזשעיימס (James)
Yoruba Jákó̩bù, Jakobu
Zulu: Jakobe

Popularity
James is one of the most common male names in the English-speaking world. In the United States, James was one of the five most common given names for male babies for most of the 20th century. Its popularity peaked during the Baby Boom (Census records 1940–1960), when it was the most popular name for baby boys. Its popularity has declined considerably over the past 30 years, but it still remains one of the 20 most common names for boys.

In Northern Ireland, the name has appeared among the 10 most popular for the last quarter of the 20th century and into the 21st. In 2013, James was the eighth most popular name for boys in Australia.

James is the second most common first name for living individuals in the United States, belonging to roughly 3.4 million people in the United States as of 2021, according to the Social Security Administration.

See also
 
 
 James (surname)
 John (disambiguation) (similar name)

References

External links

Given names of Hebrew language origin
English-language masculine given names
English masculine given names
French masculine given names
Masculine given names
Modern names of Hebrew origin